St. John's Episcopal Church is a historic Episcopal church located at Phelps in Ontario County, New York. It was built in 1849, the chancel was extended in 1897, and the tower added in 1905.  The meeting room and office addition was completed in 1954.  It is architecturally significant as a Gothic Revival-style church that reflects the "English parish" movement traceable to the Church of St. James the Less in Philadelphia.

It was listed on the National Register of Historic Places in 1978.

The congregation of St. John's merged with St. John's Episcopal Church, Clifton Springs in 1967.  Currently, the historic building houses the Phelps Arts Center.

References

External links
Town of Phelps NY | Home of the Sauerkraut Festival
 Phelps Arts Center (archived in 2011)
 St. John's Episcopal Church, Clifton Springs

Churches completed in 1849
19th-century Episcopal church buildings
Churches on the National Register of Historic Places in New York (state)
Gothic Revival church buildings in New York (state)
Phelps, New York
Churches in Ontario County, New York
Episcopal church buildings in New York (state)
1849 establishments in New York (state)
National Register of Historic Places in Ontario County, New York